Yosri a/l Derma Raju (born 15 July 1982 in Negeri Sembilan) is a former Malaysian footballer. He is of Orang Asli heritage.

Yosri has played for Sarawak FA in 2012 Malaysia Super League season. From 2013 to 2015 he played for Sime Darby F.C., and from 2016 to 2017 he played for MISC-MIFA. He also played for Negeri Sembilan FA, Selangor FA, Pahang FA, PDRM FA, Johor FA and UPB-MyTeam FC. His younger brother, Azari Dermaraju, was also a footballer, and had played with Betaria FC in the 2012 Malaysia Premier League.

Yosri has played for the Malaysia under 23 team and also the senior team.

References

1982 births
Living people
Orang Asli
Malaysia international footballers
Malaysian footballers
Selangor FA players
Negeri Sembilan FA players
Johor Darul Ta'zim F.C. players
Sarawak FA players
Sri Pahang FC players
PDRM FA players
Sime Darby F.C. players
People from Negeri Sembilan
Malaysia Super League players
Association football defenders
Southeast Asian Games bronze medalists for Malaysia
Southeast Asian Games medalists in football
Competitors at the 2003 Southeast Asian Games